

Players
As of 2 August 2017.

Competitions

Hong Kong Second Division League

Table

League Matches

Hong Kong FA Cup Junior Division

References

Happy Valley AA seasons
Hong Kong football clubs 2017–18 season